King Otto may refer to:

Otto of Greece (1815–1867), first modern king of Greece from 1833 to 1862.
Otto, King of Bavaria (1848–1916), King of Bavaria from 1886 to 1913 and nephew of the above
Otto I, Holy Roman Emperor, (912–973), also King of East Francia and Italy
Otto II, Holy Roman Emperor, (955–983), also King of East Francia and Italy
Otto III, Holy Roman Emperor, (980–1002), also King of East Francia and Italy
Otto IV, Holy Roman Emperor, (1175 or 1176–1218), one of two rival kings of the Holy Roman Empire
King Otto (film), a 2021 documentary film about the football trainer Otto Rehhagel

See also
King Ottokar (disambiguation)